YOUR Radio (formerly Castle Rock FM) was an Independent Local Radio station, serving Argyll & Bute, Inverclyde and West Dunbartonshire. It was VT (Voice Tracked) and was owned and operated by Nation Broadcasting Group. Since 31 March 2020 the station had been relaying Nation Radio Scotland on its transmitters as a response to UK government restrictions due to the COVID-19 pandemic.

Overview
Originally broadcast as Castle Rock FM, the Dumbarton-based licence relaunched as YOUR Radio when it expanded its coverage area to Helensburgh (broadcasting on 106.9 FM). Previously owned by Clyde and Forth Press, it was sold onto Romanes Media Group, until the firm was bought by Newsquest in August 2015. Three months later, the station was bought out for an undisclosed sum by directors Gary Marshall and Spencer Pryor. On 6 September 2018 Nation Radio took ownership of Your Radio.

On 1 April 2020, YOUR Radio became Nation Radio Scotland.

Programming
All of Nation Radio's programming was produced and broadcast from voice tracked DJs from various locations in Scotland. It is no longer a studio based operation. The station's weekday presenters are Derek McIntyre (Breakfast/Mid Morning) and Suzi McGuire (Drivetime).

News
Local news bulletins aired hourly from 6am to 6pm and 6am to 12pm on weekdays.

News was provided by Bauer from Radio Clyde studios in Clydebank.

References

External links
Nation Radio Scotland Website
Listen Live Online

Radio stations in Glasgow
Nation Broadcasting